Ron Rogers (18 December 1883 – 28 June 1915) was a rugby union player, who represented Great Britain against New Zealand. He died at Krithia, Gallipoli, Ottoman Turkey during World War I.

References

1883 births
1915 deaths
British military personnel killed in World War I
Place of birth missing